Jesse Engelbrecht (born 5 January 1983 in Durban) is a South African male squash player who has also represented Zimbabwe formerly in international competitions including the 2002 Commonwealth Games.

Biography 
Jesse Engelbrecht was born in Durban but settled in Zimbabwe for a while as his grandparents and parents lived in Zimbabwe. He applied for the South African citizenship in 2007  in international squash competitions.

Career 
He made his international debut in the 2002 PSA World Tour for Zimbabwe. He also went on to represent Zimbabwe at the 2002 Commonwealth Games and competed in the Men's singles and Men's doubles squash events. He later moved to South Africa and competed for South Africa in international level including the 2007 Men's World Team Squash Championships, 2008 Men's British Open Squash Championship and 2009 Men's World Team Squash Championships as a part of 2009 PSA World Tour. Jesse retired from professional squash career in 2010 and started his coaching career soon after his retirement. He is currently residing in England and has been running a Squash Academy called Jengelbrecht.

References 

1983 births
Living people
South African male squash players
Zimbabwean male squash players
Squash players at the 2002 Commonwealth Games
Commonwealth Games competitors for Zimbabwe
Zimbabwean expatriates in South Africa
Sportspeople from Durban
21st-century South African people
21st-century Zimbabwean people